Clyde Scammell Brown (November 26, 1926 – October 18, 1965) was a Canadian politician. He represented the electoral district of Bonavista South in the Newfoundland and Labrador House of Assembly from 1951 to 1956. He is a member of the Liberal Party of Newfoundland and Labrador. He was born at King's Cove, Newfoundland. He died at an Ottawa hospital in 1965.

References

1926 births
1965 deaths
Liberal Party of Newfoundland and Labrador MHAs